Carlos Filipe Carvalho Ferreira Silva, known as Carlos Filipe (born 15 September 1975) is a former Portuguese football player.

Club career
He made his Primeira Liga debut for Porto on 2 June 1994 in a game against Beira-Mar.

Honours
Portugal Under-18
UEFA European Under-18 Championship: 1994

References

External links
 

1975 births
Footballers from Porto
Living people
Portuguese footballers
Portugal youth international footballers
Portugal under-21 international footballers
FC Porto players
Primeira Liga players
C.F. União de Lamas players
Liga Portugal 2 players
Gil Vicente F.C. players
Cádiz CF players
Portuguese expatriate footballers
Expatriate footballers in Spain
Associação Naval 1º de Maio players
C.F. União players
F.C. Tirsense players
F.C. Lixa players
Ermesinde S.C. players
S.C. Coimbrões players
Association football midfielders